Lovelite is an American Christian music pop rock worship band from Southern California, where they play a version of Christian rock, CCM, indie rock, and synthpop music. Their two main members are husband-and-wife, Andrew and Jen Polfer. They have released four extended plays and three studio albums, mostly with Come&Live! Records, where they got attention for In Three Persons.

Background
Lovelite is a Southern California-based Christian pop rock worship group, established in 2008, who are a co-lead vocalist husband-and-wife lead band Andrew Polfer and Jen Polfer, where she is a keyboardist, Brandon Burr, a keyboardist and bassist, and Jonathan Hall, a keyboardist and guitarist. Their former members were guitarist and keyboardist, Adam Taylor, and drummer, Darla Hawn.

Music history
The band started as a musical entity in 2008, where they drew the most attention for the studio album, In Three Persons, that was released on June 12, 2012, from Come&Live! Records. Recently, Andrew Polfer co-wrote the song 'Body Mind & Soul' with Phil Wickham. It appears on Wickham's Living Hope album (2019).

Members
Current members
 Andrew Polfer - vocals, guitar
 Jen Polfer - vocals, guitar, keys
 Brandon Burr - bass, keys
 Jonathan Hall - guitar, keys
Former members
 Adam Taylor - guitar, keys
 Darla Hawn  - drums

Discography
Independent albums
 All Color (2008)
Studio albums
 All Color (2009, Come&Live!)
 Nearness (2010, Come&Live!)
 In Three Persons (2012, Come&Live!)
 Apocolypse Hymnal (2018, Independent)
EPs
 The Faithful Father (2011/12, Come&Live!)
 His Beloved Son (2011/12, Come&Live!)
 Our Holy Ghost (2011/12, Come&Live!)
 Hopeful Strangers (October 30, 2015, Independent)

References

External links
Official website

Musical groups from California
2008 establishments in California
Musical groups established in 2008